Coalcliff railway station is located on the South Coast railway line in New South Wales, Australia. It serves the seaside village of Coalcliff opening in August 1920. A yard exists south of the station for the Illawarra Coke Company's Coalcliff Cokeworks. Although rail transport had ceased some time prior, the cokeworks remained open until mid-2013. A passing loop to the east of the station remains in use. South of the station the double line becomes single to pass through Coalcliff Tunnel.

Platforms & services
Coalcliff has one island platform with two faces and is serviced by NSW TrainLink South Coast line services travelling between Waterfall and Port Kembla. Some peak hour and late night services operate to Sydney Central, Bondi Junction and Kiama.

References

External links

Coalcliff station details Transport for New South Wales

Buildings and structures in Wollongong
Railway stations in Australia opened in 1920
Regional railway stations in New South Wales